Shamir Stephen Mullings (born 30 October 1993) is an English professional footballer who plays as a striker for Lansdowne Yonkers. Mullings is also Lansdowne's club director.

Career
Mullings has played for Southend United, Thurrock (loan), Witham Town (loan), Tilbury (loan), Harlow Town (loan), Bromley, Cray Wanderers (loan), Thamesmead Town (loan), Havant & Waterlooville, Staines Town (loan), Chelmsford City, Forest Green Rovers and Hampton & Richmond Borough (loan). He moved from Chelmsford City to Forest Green Rovers in November 2016. In February 2017 he joined National League South side Hampton & Richmond Borough on an initial one-month loan. Mullings scored once in six league games before returning to Forest Green for their promotion run-in. In November 2017 he signed for National League side Macclesfield Town on an initial two-month loan deal in a bid to play regular football. His loan was cancelled a week later having not made an appearance for the Silkmen after they discovered a previously undetected injury.

Following his release from Forest Green he joined League Two Swindon Town on trial, scoring against Cirencester Town in a pre-season friendly. The trial proved unsuccessful and on 10 July 2018 he signed for National League side Maidstone United on a one-year deal. He started the season as a first team regular scoring twice in the first twelve games, against Leyton Orient and Barrow. On 28 September 2018, he signed for National League side Dagenham & Redbridge on a season-long loan. He scored on his debut for the club which was a consolation goal in the 3–1 home defeat to Ebbsfleet United a day later. After being released by Maidstone in January 2019, he returned to Macclesfield Town on a permanent deal later that month, signing a contract until the end of the 2018–19 season. He was released at the end of the season. He was one of a number of Macclesfield players who petitioned for the club's winding-up due to unpaid wages.

In August 2019 he moved to Aldershot Town. In December 2019 he moved on loan to Dulwich Hamlet. On 9 March 2020 he joined Dulwich permanently. In September 2020 he went on trial with Hungarian top flight team Diósgyőri VTK. He scored in a friendly but was not offered a contract.

Mullings signed for Weymouth on 10 October 2020. He left the club on 16 December 2020.

Mullings joined Lansdowne Yonkers in 2021.

Career statistics

Honours
Forest Green Rovers
National League play-offs: 2017

References

1993 births
Living people
Footballers from Enfield, London
English footballers
Southend United F.C. players
Thurrock F.C. players
Witham Town F.C. players
Tilbury F.C. players
Harlow Town F.C. players
Bromley F.C. players
Cray Wanderers F.C. players
Thamesmead Town F.C. players
Havant & Waterlooville F.C. players
Staines Town F.C. players
Chelmsford City F.C. players
Forest Green Rovers F.C. players
Hampton & Richmond Borough F.C. players
Macclesfield Town F.C. players
Maidstone United F.C. players
Dagenham & Redbridge F.C. players
Aldershot Town F.C. players
Dulwich Hamlet F.C. players
Weymouth F.C. players
English Football League players
National League (English football) players
Isthmian League players
Association football forwards
Black British sportspeople
Expatriate soccer players in the United States
Lansdowne Yonkers FC players
English expatriate footballers
English expatriate sportspeople in the United States